"Steel" is an episode of the American television anthology series The Twilight Zone. Set in the near future, its premise is that human professional boxing has been banned and replaced by android boxing. The story follows a once-famous human boxer who works as a manager for an antiquated android while struggling to come to grips with his career having been taken over by machines.

The episode is based on the short story of the same name by Richard Matheson first published in the May 1956 issue of The Magazine of Fantasy & Science Fiction.

Opening narration

Plot
In the near-future year of 1974, boxing between human fighters has been criminalized and the sport is dominated by fighting robots. Former boxer Timothy Kelly (nicknamed "Steel" because, as a heavyweight, he was never knocked down) manages a B2-model robot called "Battling Maxo", an older model that is no longer in demand. Kelly and his partner, Pole, have used the last of their money to get to the fight venue. They are being given this chance because one of the scheduled fighters was damaged in transport. Kelly has to assure fight promoter Nolan and his assistant Maxwell that Maxo will be able to fight. After they leave Nolan's office, Kelly and Pole argue about Maxo's fitness. Kelly feels that Maxo should be able to go through with the fight despite its age and condition. Pole tests Maxo's functions and an arm spring fails, effectively prohibiting it from fighting as they don't have the funds to repair it.

Kelly decides that he will disguise himself as Maxo in order to collect the money necessary for repairs. Despite a valiant effort, he is unable to damage Maynard Flash, the B7 robot that he is fighting, even when he lands an unblocked punch directly into the back of its head. He is nearly killed but manages to last a little under three minutes of the first round. The crowd jeers and boos at Maxo's performance, it being Kelly under disguise. Afterwards, the fight promoter withdraws half of the promised reward due to poor performance; Kelly dares not protest to prevent recognition. Badly bruised but stubborn as ever, Kelly tells Pole that they will use whatever they have to repair Maxo regardless.

Closing narration

Production notes
This was the first episode sponsored by Procter & Gamble (alternating sponsorship with American Tobacco), who usually "pitched" Crest toothpaste, Lilt Home Permanent, and Prell shampoo, among their other products. Serling was not required to endorse any of P&G's products at the end of their episodes.

Serling, in his narration, had predicted that professional boxing would be outlawed within five years of the episode's airing; at the time, the sport was mired in controversy after Emile Griffith killed his opponent Benny Paret in a nationally televised and particularly brutal 1962 match. With Paret's death at Griffith's hands, as well as the death of Davey Moore from a neck injury sustained in a March 1963 contest, the specter of the sport being outlawed was a realistic possibility at the time "Steel" was broadcast. Serling's prediction did not come to fruition; although boxing declined in popularity in the succeeding years, it has never been outlawed.

Each of the five credited cast members appeared in one other episode — Lee Marvin starred in "The Grave" (October 1961), Joe Mantell starred as "Nervous Man in a Four Dollar Room" (October 1960), Chuck Hicks had an uncredited bit part as a mover in "Ninety Years Without Slumbering" (December 1963, two months after this episode), Merritt Bohn was billed at the bottom of the cast list in a bit part as a truck driver in Twilight Zone'''s second episode, "One for the Angels" (October 1959) and Frank London was billed third from the end in a bit part as a driver in ""A Penny for Your Thoughts" (February 1961).

See alsoReal Steel, a 2011 American science fiction film also based on Richard Matheson's short story
"I, (Annoyed Grunt)-Bot", a 2004 episode of The Simpsons with a similar plot
"Raging Bender" from the second season of Futurama also depicts a hidden human controller of a robotic boxer.

References

DeVoe, Bill. (2008). Trivia from The Twilight Zone. Albany, GA: Bear Manor Media. 
Grams, Martin. (2008). The Twilight Zone: Unlocking the Door to a Television Classic. Churchville, MD: OTR Publishing. 
Zicree, Marc Scott: The Twilight Zone Companion''. Sillman-James Press, 1982 (second edition)

External links

1963 American television episodes
Adaptations of works by Richard Matheson
Boxing mass media
Television episodes written by Richard Matheson
Television shows based on short fiction
The Twilight Zone (1959 TV series season 5) episodes
Television episodes about robots
Fiction set in 1974